Gilbert Alfred Franklin (1919–2004) was an English-born American sculptor and educator. He was active in Providence, Rhode Island and Wellfleet, Massachusetts; and was best known for his public art sculptures.

Early life and education 
Gilbert Franklin was born on June 6, 1919 in Birmingham, England, and raised in Attleboro, Massachusetts. His father was a jeweler.

Franklin's earliest coursework was at the Hawthorne School of Art (now the Cape Cod School of Art), studying under John Robinson Frazier. He attended Rhode Island School of Design (RISD), graduating with a BFA degree in 1941; as well as completing studies at the Museo Nacional de Arte (in 1942) in Mexico City; and the American Academy in Rome (in 1949). He had been a student of Waldemar Raemisch, and John Howard Benson.

Franklin was married to Joyce Gertrude (née Swirsky) and together they had one daughter, art historian Nina Franklin Berson.

Career 
Franklin served on the fine arts faculty at RISD between 1942 to 1985. Two of his bronze works are prominent on the RISD campus, Orpheus Ascending (1963) and Daybreak (1968) the latter found on the "RISD beach". He had been honored as the H.M. Danforth Distinguished Professor of Fine Arts; and served as a Dean of the fine arts department at RISD. Additionally he taught at San Jose State University, University of Pennsylvania, Yale University, and Harvard University.

After his former professor Raemisch's death in 1955, Franklin completed Raemisch's 19 figure sculpture commission for public art in Philadelphia.

In 1948, he was awarded the Rome Prize fellowship. In 1959, he won the grand prize at the Boston Arts Festival for his work, Beach Figure. Franklin was awarded the honorary title of National Academician (1991). 

Franklin died at the age of 85 on October 19, 2004 in his home in Wellfleet, Massachusetts.

Public works 
 Abraham Lincoln statue (1954), Roger Williams Park, Providence, Rhode Island; gift of the Henry W. Harvey Trust
 Orpheus Ascending (1963), Frazier Terrace, Rhode Island School of Design campus, Providence, Rhode Island
 Daybreak (1968), Rhode Island School of Design campus, Providence, Rhode Island
 Harry S. Truman statue (1976), Independence Square, Independence, Missouri
 U.S. Navy Memorial bas-relief (1991), U.S. Navy Memorial, Washington, DC
 Seaforms (1993), Wellfleet Public Library, Wellfleet, Massachusetts

Exhibitions 
 1993, Celebrating Long Point, group exhibition, Noel Fine Arts, Bronxville, New York
 2004, solo, Picture Gallery, Cornish, New Hampshire 
 2016, The Bridge at the End of the Road, solo exhibition, John Spoor Broome Library Gallery, CSU Channel Islands (CI)

References

External links 

 Oral history interview with Gilbert A. Franklin, 1978 April 13 from Archives of American Art, Smithsonian Institution

1919 births
2004 deaths
People from Wellfleet, Massachusetts
Artists from Providence, Rhode Island
American male sculptors
Rhode Island School of Design alumni
Rhode Island School of Design faculty
National Academy of Design members
People from Attleboro, Massachusetts
20th-century American male artists
20th-century American sculptors